Mahendar Prasad Singh; (23 August 1949 - 16 January 2005) popularly known as Mahendar Singh was an Indian communist politician and guerrilla leader. Mahendar Singh was three time winning legislative assembly member from Bagodar the state of Bihar, later the state of Jharkhand as member of CPIML Liberation.

Mahendar Prasad Singh was follow parliamentary and un-parliamentary both ways. He was a guerrilla leader of Lal Sena. He was shot and killed at Bagodar by the Maoists on 16 January 2005. At the time of legislative election he was campaigning for the fourth term when he was killed.

References 

1949 births
2005 deaths
Communist Party of India (Marxist–Leninist) Liberation politicians
Bihar MLAs 1990–1995
Bihar MLAs 1995–2000
Jharkhand MLAs 2000–2005